St. Richard's Catholic Church is a historic church at the junction of Hickory and Cleveland Streets in Bald Knob, Arkansas. It is attended by St. James Church, Searcy, in the Diocese of Little Rock.

A single story structure, the church was built out of fieldstone in the Rustic style popularized in the 1930s by the National Park Service. It was built in 1939, and represents Bald Knob's best example of this style in an ecclesiastical structure. It has a gabled roof, with a project gabled entry vestibule, with a round window in the main gable above. It was listed on the National Register of Historic Places in 1992.

See also
National Register of Historic Places listings in White County, Arkansas

References

Churches in the Roman Catholic Diocese of Little Rock
Churches on the National Register of Historic Places in Arkansas
Churches in White County, Arkansas
National Register of Historic Places in White County, Arkansas
Buildings and structures in Bald Knob, Arkansas
1939 establishments in Arkansas
Churches completed in 1939
Rustic architecture in Arkansas